Catoxyopsis is a genus of mantis in the subfamily Vatinae. It consists of a single species, Catoxyopsis dubiosa.

See also
List of mantis genera and species

References

Stagmatopterinae
Monotypic insect genera
Taxa named by Ermanno Giglio-Tos
Mantodea genera